Jawaan is a 2017 Indian Telugu-language action thriller film directed by B. V. S. Ravi produced by Krishna on Arunachal Creations banner. It stars Sai Dharam Tej and Mehreen Pirzada while Prasanna and Subbaraju play the antagonists. The music was composed by S. Thaman. Jawaan was released worldwide on 1 December 2017.

Plot 
Jai (Sai Dharam Tej) is a proud Rashtriya Swayamsevak Sangh volunteer who wants to serve India by getting into the DRDO organization. He gave the interview to the DRDO, but his selection is put on hold for an indefinite period as a better candidate was selected. This is also the time when Jai's childhood friend Keshava (Prasanna), who is a dreaded international criminal based in Hong Kong, plans to get hold of the new missile system which has been developed by the DRDO in Hyderabad. Keshava is on the payroll of foreign enemies working to destroy India. The plot goes on. How Jai, with the help of his friends and police, defeats the heinous plans of Keshava by killing him and his henchmen in the climax even at the cost of danger to his family forms the rest of the story. The main theme of the movie is patriotism and willpower.

Cast

 Sai Dharam Tej as Yellapragada Jai
 Mehreen Pirzada as Bhargavi
 Prasanna as Keshava (Voice dubbed by Hemachandra)
 Subbaraju as Iqbal
 Jayaprakash as Yellapragada Ramachandra Rao, Jai's father
 Easwari Rao as Lakshmi, Jai's mother
 Kota Srinivasa Rao as Prakash Rao, Jai's uncle
 Surya as Raghavram (Keshava's father)
 Nagendra Babu as Police Commissioner
 Appaji Ambarisha Darbha as Senior Scientist
 Anish Kuruvilla as DRDO scientist
 Satyam Rajesh as Rajesh, Jai's friend
 Raj Madiraju as Bhargavi's father
 Karunya Chowdary as Jai's sister
 Sashidhar as Jai's brother
 Revathi as Jai's sister-in-law

Soundtrack
The film's soundtrack was composed by S. Thaman.

Production
The movie was launched on 30 January 2017 with a formal pooja ceremony. The ceremony was flanked by many guests from the Tolly town. Jr NTR sounded the clapboard, while Koratala Siva switched on the camera and V. V. Vinayak directed the first shot. The Pre-look of the movie was released on 8 June 2017.
The prerelease event was conducted on 19 November 2017 in Hyderabad at Peoples Plaza, where audio of the movie was released. Director Koratala Siva and V. V. Vinayak attended as the chief guest.

References

External links
 

2010s Telugu-language films
2017 action thriller films
Films about terrorism in India
Indian action thriller films